The Order of Gabriela Silang is an all-female order of the Philippines founded on September 19, 2003. It is named after Philippine national heroine, Gabriela Silang.

Award and Rank 
The Order of Gabriela Silang is a single-class Order which may be conferred upon the spouses of heads of state and/or of government, both Filipino and foreign.

Insignia 
The ribbon of the order is red with yellow and blue borders.

Recipients 
 Elena Ceaușescu (April 9, 1975)
 Queen Alia al-Hussein of Jordan (March 1, 1976)
 Beatrix of the Netherlands
 Sirikit
 Danielle Mitterrand (11 July 1989)
 Josephine Bongo, First Lady of the Republic of Gabon
 Queen Sofía of Spain (2 April 1995)):
 Empress Michiko (December 3, 2002)
 Laura Bush, First Lady of the United States of America (October 18, 2003)
 Luz Magsaysay, First Lady of the Philippines (21 August 2004) 
 Aurora Quezon, First Lady of the Philippines (April 28, 2005)
  Victoria Syquia Quirino-Delgado, First Lady of the Philippines (5 December,2005)

See also

 List of awards honoring women

References 

Orders, decorations, and medals for women
Orders, decorations, and medals of the Philippines
Spouses of national leaders
Order of Gabriela Silang